"Spaceman" is the first single from Canadian singer Bif Naked's third album, I Bificus. The song peaked at #36 on Canada's RPM singles chart.

Boomtang Boys mix
In 1998, Canadian group The Boomtang Boys created a remixed dance version of the song, which reached #2 on the Canadian Singles Chart.

References

External links

1998 songs
1998 singles
Bif Naked songs